The Last Testament of Oscar Wilde is a 1983 novel by Peter Ackroyd. It won the Somerset Maugham Award in 1984.

Plot summary 

The novel is written in the form of a diary which Oscar Wilde was writing in Paris in 1900, up to his death. The diary itself is completely fictional, as is the detail contained, although the events and most of the characters (such as the characters of Lord Alfred Douglas, Robert Ross and the Earl of Rosebery and his incarceration, at Pentonville, later Reading) are real. In this diary he looks back at his life, writing, and ruin through trial and gaol. Included are fairy tales much like those Wilde wrote, although again these are wholly Ackroyd's invention. The last pages are written in the character of Maurice, Wilde's valet.

References

External links 
 Ukko Hänninen: Rewriting Literary History: Peter Ackroyd and Intertextuality

1983 British novels
Fictional diaries
Cultural depictions of Oscar Wilde
Fiction set in 1900
1980s LGBT novels
Novels set in Paris
Novels by Peter Ackroyd
Hamish Hamilton books
British LGBT novels